Érik Antonio Lira Méndez (born 8 May 2000) is a Mexican professional footballer who plays as a defensive midfielder for Liga MX club Cruz Azul.

International career
On 27 October 2021, Lira made his senior national team debut under Gerardo Martino in a friendly match against Ecuador.

Career statistics

Club

International

Honours
Cruz Azul
Supercopa de la Liga MX: 2022

Individual
Liga MX Best XI: Apertura 2021
Liga MX All-Star: 2021, 2022

References

External links
 
 
 

Living people
2000 births
Association football midfielders
Club Universidad Nacional footballers
Liga MX players
Mexican footballers
Mexico international footballers